Oasis were an English rock band formed in Manchester in 1991. Originally known as the Rain, the group initially consisted of Liam Gallagher (lead vocals, tambourine), Paul Arthurs (guitar), Paul McGuigan (bass guitar) and Tony McCarroll (drums). Liam's older brother Noel (lead guitar, vocals) later joined as a fifth member, finalising the group's core lineup. During the course of their existence, they had various lineup changes, with the Gallagher brothers remaining the only staple members. 

Oasis signed to independent record label Creation Records in 1993 and released their record-setting debut album Definitely Maybe (1994). The following year they recorded (What's the Story) Morning Glory? (1995) with drummer Alan White, in the midst of a chart rivalry with peers Blur. Spending ten weeks at number one on the UK Albums Chart, (What's the Story) Morning Glory? was also an international chart success and became one of the best-selling albums of all time. In addition, it stands as the fifth-best-selling album in the UK and the biggest-selling album in the UK of the 1990s. The Gallagher brothers featured regularly in tabloid newspapers for their disputes and wild lifestyles. In 1996, Oasis performed two nights at Knebworth for an audience of 125,000 each time, the largest outdoor concerts in UK history at the time. In 1997, Oasis released their third album, Be Here Now. It became the fastest-selling album in UK chart history.

Oasis' popularity later declined and McGuigan and Arthurs left in 1999 as Oasis released Standing on the Shoulder of Giants (2000). They were replaced by former Heavy Stereo guitarist Gem Archer and former Ride guitarist Andy Bell. White departed in 2004, replaced by Zak Starkey and later Chris Sharrock as touring members. Oasis released three more studio albums, Heathen Chemistry (2002), Don't Believe the Truth (2005) and Dig Out Your Soul (2008). The group abruptly disbanded after the departure of Noel Gallagher in August 2009.

As of 2009, Oasis had sold over 70 million records worldwide. They are among the most successful acts on the UK Singles Chart and Albums Chart, with eight UK number-one singles and eight UK number-one albums. The band also achieved three Platinum albums in the US. They won 17 NME Awards, nine Q Awards, four MTV Europe Music Awards and six Brit Awards, including one in 2007 for Outstanding Contribution to Music and one for the "Best Album of the Last 30 Years" for (What's the Story) Morning Glory?. They were nominated for two Grammy Awards.

History

1991–1993: Formation and early years 
In 1991, bassist Paul McGuigan, guitarist Paul Arthurs, drummer Tony McCarroll, and singer Chris Hutton formed a band called the Rain. Unsatisfied with Hutton, Arthurs invited and auditioned acquaintance Liam Gallagher as a potential replacement. Liam suggested that the band name be changed to Oasis, inspired by an Inspiral Carpets tour poster in the childhood bedroom he shared with his brother Noel, which listed the Oasis Leisure Centre in Swindon as a venue. Oasis played their first gig on 14 August 1991 at the Boardwalk club in Manchester, bottom of the bill below The Catchmen and Sweet Jesus. Noel, who was working as a roadie for Inspiral Carpets, went with them to watch Liam's band play. He and his friends did not think Oasis sounded particularly spectacular, but he began to consider the possibility of using the group as an outlet for a series of songs he had been writing for several years. Noel approached the group about joining on the provision that he would become the band's sole songwriter and leader, and that they would commit to an earnest pursuit of commercial success. Arthurs recalled, "He had loads of stuff written. When he walked in, we were a band making a racket with four tunes. All of a sudden, there were loads of ideas." Under Noel, the band crafted a musical approach that relied on simplicity, with Arthurs and McGuigan restricted to playing barre chords and root bass notes, McCarroll playing basic rhythms, and the band's amplifiers turned up to create distortion. Oasis thus created a sound described as being "so devoid of finesse and complexity that it came out sounding pretty much unstoppable".

1993–1995: Breakthrough with Definitely Maybe 
After over a year of live shows, rehearsals and a recording of a demo, the Live Demonstration tape, Oasis's big break came in May 1993 when they were spotted by Creation Records co-owner Alan McGee. Oasis were invited to play a gig at King Tut's Wah Wah Hut club in Glasgow by Sister Lovers, who shared their rehearsal rooms. Oasis, along with a group of friends, hired a van and made the journey to Glasgow. When they arrived, they were refused entry as they were not on that night's set list; the band and McGee have given contradicting statements about how they managed to get into the club. They were given the opening slot and impressed McGee, who was there to see 18 Wheeler, one of his own bands. McGee offered them a recording contract; however, they did not sign until several months later. Due to problems securing an American contract, Oasis signed a worldwide contract with Sony, which in turn licensed Oasis to Creation in the UK.

Following a limited white label release of the demo of their song "Columbia", Oasis went on a UK tour to promote the release of their first single, "Supersonic", playing venues such as the Tunbridge Wells Forum, a converted public toilet. "Supersonic" was released in April 1994, reaching number 31 in the charts. The release was followed by "Shakermaker", which became the subject of a plagiarism suit, with Oasis paying $500,000 in damages. Their third single, "Live Forever", was their first to enter the top ten of the UK charts. After troubled recording and mixing sessions, Oasis's debut album, Definitely Maybe, was released on 29 August 1994, entering the charts at number one within a week of its release, and at the time becoming the fastest selling debut album in the UK.

Nearly a year of constant live performances and recordings, along with a hedonistic lifestyle, were taking their toll on the band. This behaviour culminated during a gig in Los Angeles in September 1994, leading to an inept performance by Liam during which he made offensive remarks about American audiences and hit Noel with a tambourine. The incident upset Noel to such an extent he temporarily quit the band and flew to San Francisco (it was from this incident the song "Talk Tonight" was written). He was tracked down by Creation's Tim Abbot and they made a trip to Las Vegas. Once there, the elder Gallagher was persuaded to continue with the band. He reconciled with Liam and the tour resumed in Minneapolis. The group followed up with the fourth single from Definitely Maybe, "Cigarettes & Alcohol", and the Christmas single "Whatever", issued in December 1994 which entered the British charts at number three.

1995–1996: (What's the Story) Morning Glory?, international success, and peak popularity
Oasis had their first UK number one single in April 1995 with "Some Might Say". At the same time, drummer Tony McCarroll was ousted from the band. McCarroll said, on leaving Oasis, that he was "unlawfully expelled from the partnership" for what he called a "personality clash" with the brothers. The Gallaghers, on the other hand, doubted McCarroll's musical ability, with Noel saying: "I like Tony as a geezer but he wouldn't have been able to drum the new songs". McCarroll was replaced by Alan White, formerly of Starclub and younger brother of renowned studio percussionist Steve White and recommended to Noel by Paul Weller. White made his debut for the band at a Top of the Pops performance of "Some Might Say". Oasis began recording material for their second album in May of that year in Rockfield Studios near Monmouth. The band, by this point, had recorded the concert that would see release in August as Live by the Sea.

During this period, the British press seized upon a supposed rivalry between Oasis and Britpop band Blur. Previously, Oasis did not associate themselves with the Britpop movement and were not invited to perform on the BBC's Britpop Now programme introduced by Blur singer Damon Albarn. On 14 August 1995, Blur and Oasis released singles on the same day, setting up the "Battle of Britpop" that dominated the national news. Blur's "Country House" outsold Oasis' "Roll with It" 274,000 copies to 216,000 during the week. Oasis' management came up with several reasons for this, claiming "Country House" sold more because it was less expensive (£1.99 vs £3.99) and because there were two versions of "Country House" with different B-sides, forcing serious fans to buy two copies. An alternative explanation given at the time by Creation was that there were problems associated with the barcode on the "Roll with It" single case, which did not record all sales. Noel Gallagher told The Observer in September that he hoped members of Blur would "catch AIDS and die", which caused a media furore. He apologised in a formal letter to various publications.

McGuigan briefly left the band in September 1995, citing nervous exhaustion. He was replaced by Scott McLeod, formerly of the Ya Ya's, who was featured on some of the tour dates as well as in the "Wonderwall" video before leaving abruptly while on tour in the US. McLeod contacted Noel claiming he felt he had made the wrong decision. Noel replied: "I think you have too. Good luck signing on". To complete the tour, McGuigan was persuaded to return to the band.

Although a softer sound initially led to mixed reviews, Oasis' second album, (What's the Story) Morning Glory?, was a worldwide commercial success, selling over four million copies and becoming the fifth-best-selling album in UK chart history. By 2008, it had sold up to 22 million units in the world, making it one of the best-selling albums of all time. The album spawned two further hit singles, "Wonderwall" and "Don't Look Back in Anger", which reached numbers two and one respectively. It also contained "Champagne Supernova", which featured guitar and backing vocals by Paul Weller and received critical acclaim. The song reached number one on the US Modern Rock Tracks chart. In November 1995, Oasis played on back-to-back nights at Earls Court in London, the biggest ever indoor gigs in Europe at the time. Gallagher played a customised Union Jack emblazoned Sheraton guitar, commercially released as Supernova.

On 27 and 28 April 1996, the group played their first headline outdoor concerts, at Maine Road football stadium, home of Manchester City F.C., of whom the Gallagher brothers have been fans since childhood. Highlights from the second night featured on the video ...There and Then, released later the same year (along with footage from their Earls Court gigs). As their career reached its zenith, Oasis performed to 80,000 people over two nights at Balloch Country Park at Loch Lomond in Scotland on 3 and 4 August, before back-to-back concerts at Knebworth House on 10 and 11 August. The band sold out both shows within minutes. The audience of 125,000 people each night (2.5 million people applied for tickets, and 250,000 were actually sold, meaning the possibility of 20 sold out nights) was a record-breaking number for an outdoor concert held in the UK and remains the largest demand for a show in British history.

Oasis were due to record an episode of MTV Unplugged at the Royal Festival Hall but Liam pulled out, citing a sore throat. He watched the performance from a balcony with beer and cigarettes, heckling Noel's singing between songs. Four days later the group left for a tour of American arenas but Liam refused to go; the band decided to continue the tour with Noel on vocals. Liam rejoined the tour on 30 August and on 4 September 1996, Oasis performed "Champagne Supernova" at the 1996 MTV Video Music Awards at Radio City Music Hall in New York City. Liam made gestures at Noel during his guitar solo, then spat beer all over the stage before storming off. A few weeks later Noel flew home without the band, who followed on another flight. This event prompted media speculation that the group were splitting up. The brothers soon reconciled and decided to complete the tour.

1996–1999: Be Here Now and The Masterplan

Oasis spent the end of 1996 and the first quarter of 1997 at Abbey Road Studios in London and Ridge Farm Studios in Surrey recording their third album. Quarrels between the Gallagher brothers plagued the recording sessions. Be Here Now was released in August 1997. Preceded by the UK number one single "D'You Know What I Mean?", the album was their most anticipated effort, and as such became the subject of considerable media attention. Footage of excited fans clutching copies made ITV News at Ten, leading anchorman Trevor McDonald to intone the band's phrase "mad for it". By the end of the first day of release, Be Here Now had sold 424,000 units and first week sales reached 696,000, making it the fastest-selling album in British history until Adele released 25 in 2015. The album debuted at number two on the Billboard 200 in the US, but its first week sales of 152,000—below expected sales of 400,000 copies—were considered a disappointment. Predominantly written by Noel Gallagher during a holiday with Kate Moss, Johnny Depp and Mick Jagger, Gallagher has since expressed regret over the writing process of Be Here Now, adding it doesn't match up to the standard of the band's first two albums;

Noel had been ambivalent about the album in pre-release interviews, telling NME, "This record ain’t going to surprise many people," however there was nobody around him to echo his reservations. "Everyone’s going: ‘It’s brilliant!’” he later said. “And right towards the end, we’re doing the mixing and I’m thinking to myself: ‘Hmmm, I don’t know about this now.’” When the album was released Oasis were woven into Britain’s cultural fabric like no other band since the Beatles, and according to their former press officer Johnny Hopkins: "There were more hangers-on, constantly telling them they were the greatest thing. That tended to block out the critical voices." Dorian Lynskey writes, "If it couldn't be Britpop’s zenith, then it must be the nadir. It can't be just a collection of songs – some good, some bad, most too long, all insanely overproduced – but an emblem of the hubris before the fall, like a dictator’s statue pulled to the ground by a vengeful mob." 

After the conclusion of the Be Here Now Tour in early 1998, amidst much media criticism, the group kept a low profile. Later in the year, Oasis released a compilation album of fourteen B-sides, The Masterplan. "The really interesting stuff from around that period is the B-sides. There's a lot more inspired music on the B-sides than there is on Be Here Now itself, I think," said Noel in an interview in 2008.

It was during this time period that Noel lived at Supernova Heights in Belsize Park with his then wife Meg Matthews. Noel Gallagher lived at this property between 1997 and 1999 which was known for raucous celebrity parties with guests such as Kate Moss, Rhys Ifans, Lisa Moorish and fellow band The Charlatans. The house was eventually sold in 1999 to Davinia Taylor.

1999–2001: Line-up change and Standing on the Shoulder of Giants
In early 1999, the band began work on their fourth studio album. First details were announced in February, with Mark Stent revealed to be taking a co-producing role. Things were not going well and the shock departure of founding member Paul "Bonehead" Arthurs was announced in August. This departure was reported at the time as amicable, with Noel stating Arthurs wanted to spend more time with his family. Arthurs' statement clarified his leaving as "to concentrate on other things". However, Noel has since offered a contradicting version: that a series of violations of Noel's "no drink or drugs" policy (imposed by Noel so that Liam could sing properly) for the album's sessions resulted in a confrontation between the two. Two weeks later the departure of bassist Paul McGuigan was announced. The Gallagher brothers held a press conference shortly thereafter, in which they assured reporters that "the future of Oasis is secure. The story and the glory will go on."

After the completion of the recording sessions, the band began searching for replacement members. The first new member to be announced was new lead/rhythm guitarist Colin "Gem" Archer, formerly of Heavy Stereo, who later claimed to have been approached by Noel Gallagher only a couple of days after Arthurs' departure was publicly announced. Finding a replacement bassist took more time and effort: the band were rehearsing with David Potts, but he quickly resigned, and they brought in Andy Bell, former guitarist/songwriter of Ride and Hurricane#1 as their new bassist. Bell had never played bass before and had to learn to play it (with Noel since saying, "I was amazed that Andy was up for actually playing the bass y’know, cos he's such a good guitarist"), along with a handful of songs from Oasis' back catalogue, in preparation for a scheduled US tour in December 1999.

With the folding of Creation Records, Oasis formed their own label, Big Brother, which released all of Oasis' subsequent records in the UK and Ireland. Oasis' fourth album, Standing on the Shoulder of Giants, was released in February 2000 to good first-week sales. It reached number one on the British charts and peaked at number 24 on the Billboard charts. Four singles were released from the album: "Go Let It Out", "Who Feels Love?", "Sunday Morning Call" and "Where Did It All Go Wrong?", which the first three were top five UK singles.  The "Go Let It Out" music video was shot before Bell joined the group and therefore featured the unusual line-up of Liam on rhythm guitar, Archer on lead guitar and Noel on bass. With the departure of the founding members, the band made several small changes to their image and sound. The cover featured a new "Oasis" logo, designed by Gem Archer, and the album was also the first Oasis release to include a song written by Liam Gallagher, entitled "Little James". The songs also had more experimental, psychedelic influences. Standing on the Shoulder of Giants received lukewarm reviews and sales slumped in its second week of release in the US. 

To support the record the band staged an eventful world tour. While touring in Barcelona in 2000, Oasis were forced to cancel a gig when an attack of tendinitis caused Alan White's arm to seize up, and the band spent the night drinking instead. After a row between the two brothers, Noel declared he was quitting touring overseas altogether, and Oasis were supposed to finish the tour without him. Noel eventually returned for the Irish and British legs of the tour, which included two major shows at Wembley Stadium. A live album of the first show, called Familiar to Millions, was released in late 2000 to mixed reviews.

2001–2003: Heathen Chemistry

Throughout 2001, Oasis split time between sessions for their fifth studio album and live shows around the world. Gigs included the month-long Tour of Brotherly Love with the Black Crowes and Spacehog and a show in Paris supporting Neil Young. The album, Heathen Chemistry, Oasis' first album with new members Andy Bell and Gem Archer, was released in July 2002. The album reached number 1 in the UK and number 23 in the US, although critics gave it mixed reviews. There were four singles released from the album: "The Hindu Times", "Stop Crying Your Heart Out", "Little by Little/She Is Love" which were written by Noel, and "Songbird", written by Liam and the first single not to be written by Noel. The record blended the band's sonic experiments from their last albums, but also went for a more basic rock sound. The recording of Heathen Chemistry was much more balanced for the band, with all of the members, apart from White, writing songs. Johnny Marr provided additional guitar as well as backup vocals on a couple of songs.

After the album's release, the band embarked on a successful world tour that was once again filled with incidents. In late summer 2002, while the band were on tour in the US, Noel, Bell and touring keyboardist Jay Darlington were involved in a car accident in Indianapolis. While none of the band members sustained any major injuries, some shows were cancelled as a result. In December 2002, the latter half of the German leg of the band's European tour had to be postponed after Liam Gallagher, Alan White and three other members of the band's entourage were arrested after a violent brawl at a Munich nightclub. The band had been drinking heavily and tests showed that Liam had used cocaine. Liam lost two front teeth and kicked a police officer in the ribs, while Alan suffered minor head injuries after getting hit with an ashtray. Two years later Liam was fined around £40,000. The band finished their tour in March 2003 after returning to those postponed dates.

2003–2007: Alan White's departure and Don't Believe the Truth
Liam Gallagher said Oasis began recording a sixth album in late December 2003 with producers Death in Vegas at Sawmills Studios in Cornwall. The album was originally planned for a September 2004 release, to coincide with the 10th anniversary of the release of Definitely Maybe, However, long-time drummer Alan White, who at this time had played on nearly all of the band's material, had been asked to leave the band. At the time, his brother Steve White stated on his own website that "the spirit of being in a band was kicked out of him" and he wanted to be with his girlfriend. White was replaced by Zak Starkey, drummer of the Who and the son of the Beatles' Ringo Starr. Though Starkey performed on studio recordings and toured with the band, he was not officially a member and the band were a four-piece for the first time in their career. Starkey played publicly for the first time at Poole Lighthouse.

A few days later, Oasis, with Starkey, headlined the Glastonbury Festival for the second time in their career and performed a largely greatest hits set, which included two new songs — Gem Archer's "A Bell Will Ring" and Liam Gallagher's "The Meaning of Soul". The performance received negative reviews, with NME calling it a "disaster." The BBC's Tom Bishop called Oasis' set "lacklustre and uneventful ... prompting a mixed reception from fans", mainly because of Liam's uninspired singing and Starkey's lack of experience with the band's material.

After much turbulence, the band's sixth album was finally recorded in Los Angeles-based Capitol Studios from October to December the same year. Producer Dave Sardy took over the lead producing role from Noel, who decided to step back from these duties after a decade of producing leadership over the band. In May 2005, after three years and as many scrapped recording sessions, the band released their sixth studio album, Don't Believe the Truth, fulfilling their contract with Sony BMG. It followed the path of Heathen Chemistry as being a collaborative project again, rather than a Noel-written album. The album was the first in a decade not to feature drumming by Alan White, marking the recording debut of Starkey. The record was generally hailed as the band's best effort since Morning Glory by fans and critics alike, spawning two UK number one singles: "Lyla" and "The Importance of Being Idle", whilst "Let There Be Love" entered at number 2. Oasis picked up two awards at the Q Awards: one People's Choice Award and the second for Don't Believe the Truth as Best Album. Following in the footsteps of Oasis' previous five albums, Don't Believe the Truth also entered the UK album charts at number one. To date the album has sold more than 6 million copies worldwide.

In May 2005, the band's new line-up embarked on a large scale world tour. Beginning on 10 May 2005 at the London Astoria, and finishing on 31 March 2006 in front of a sold-out gig in Mexico City, Oasis played more live shows than at any time since the Definitely Maybe Tour, visiting 26 countries and headlining 113 shows for over 3.2 million people. The tour passed without any major incidents and was the band's most successful in more than a decade. The tour included sold-out shows at New York's Madison Square Garden and LA's Hollywood Bowl. A rockumentary film made during the tour, entitled Lord Don't Slow Me Down directed by Dick Carruthers was released in October 2007. A second DVD included live footage from an Oasis gig in Manchester from 2 July 2005.

Oasis released a compilation double album entitled Stop the Clocks in 2006, featuring what the band considers to be their "definitive" songs. The band received the Brit Award for Outstanding Contribution to Music in February 2007, playing several of their most famous songs afterwards. Oasis released their first ever digital-only release, "Lord Don't Slow Me Down", in October 2007. The song debuted at number ten in the UK singles chart.

2007–2009: Dig Out Your Soul
The band's resurgence in popularity since the success of Don't Believe the Truth was highlighted in February 2008 when, in a poll to find the fifty greatest British albums of the last fifty years conducted by Q magazine and HMV, two Oasis albums were voted first and second (Definitely Maybe and (What's The Story) Morning Glory? respectively). Two other albums by the band appeared in the list – Don't Believe The Truth came in at number fourteen, and the album that has previously been heavily criticised by some of the media, Be Here Now, made the list at no. 22.

Oasis recorded for a couple of months in 2007 – between July and September – completing work on two new songs and demoing the rest. They then took a two-month break because of the birth of Noel's son. The band re-entered the studio on 5 November 2007 and finished recording around March 2008 with producer Dave Sardy.

In May 2008, Zak Starkey left the band after recording Dig Out Your Soul, the band's seventh studio album. He was replaced by former Icicle Works and the La's drummer Chris Sharrock on their tour but Chris was not an official member of the band and Oasis remained as a four-piece. The first single from the record was "The Shock of the Lightning" written by Noel Gallagher, and was pre-released on 29 September 2008. Dig Out Your Soul, the band's seventh studio album, was released on 6 October and went to number one in the UK and number five on the Billboard 200. The band started touring for a projected 18-month-long tour expected to last till September 2009, with support from Kasabian, the Enemy and Twisted Wheel. On 7 September 2008, while performing at Virgin Festival in Toronto, a member of the audience ran on stage and physically assaulted Noel. Noel suffered three broken and dislodged ribs as a result from the attack, and the group had to cancel several shows while he recovered. In June 2008, the band re-signed with Sony BMG for a three-album deal.

On 25 February 2009, Oasis received the NME Award for Best British Band of 2009, as well as Best Blog for Noel's 'Tales from the Middle of Nowhere'. On 4 June 2009, Oasis played the first of three concerts at Manchester's Heaton Park and after having to leave the stage twice due to a generator failure, came on the third time to declare the gig was now a free concert; it delighted the 70,000 ticket holders, 20,000 of whom claimed the refund. The band's two following gigs at the venue, on 6 and 7 June, proved a great success, with fans turning out in the thousands despite the changeable weather and first night's sound issues.

2009–present: Split, aftermath and reissues

After Liam contracted laryngitis, Oasis cancelled a gig at V Festival in Chelmsford on 23 August 2009. Noel stated in 2011 that the gig was cancelled due to Liam having "a hangover". Liam subsequently sued Noel, and demanded an apology, stating: "The truth is I had laryngitis, which Noel was made fully aware of that morning, diagnosed by a doctor." Noel issued an apology and the lawsuit was dropped. The band were due to perform on 28 August 2009 at the Rock en Seine festival near Paris, however mid-way through Bloc Party’s set at the festival their frontman Kele Okereke (alongside Bloc Party tour manager Peter Hill) announced that Oasis would not be performing. Two hours later, a statement from Noel appeared on the band's website:

Liam and the remaining members of Oasis decided to continue under the name Beady Eye, releasing two studio albums until their break-up in 2014. Liam started a solo career and has released three studio albums, with Arthurs joining him occasionally on tour. Noel formed a solo project, Noel Gallagher's High Flying Birds and has released three studio albums, with Sharrock and Archer later joining as members. Bell reunited with former band Ride.

On 16 February 2010, Oasis won Best British Album of the Last 30 Years – for (What's the Story) Morning Glory? – at the 2010 Brit Awards. Liam collected the award alone before presenting his speech, which thanked Bonehead, McGuigan and Alan White but not Noel. Liam threw his microphone and the band's award into the crowd. On 15 March 2010, Liam defended his actions at the awards ceremony, saying: "I'm sick of it all being about me and Noel, the last couple of months has pretty much been all about me and him so I thought it was only right to mention the other lads who played on the album and the best fans in the world," and "I thought [throwing the award] was a nice gesture to give this to the fans, obviously it was misinterpreted as per usual."

Time Flies... 1994–2009, a compilation of singles, was released on 14 June 2010. The album became the band's final album to reach number one on the UK Albums Chart. On 6 July 2011, Absolute Radio uploaded a video to YouTube where Noel Gallagher speaks about the night Oasis ended. Noel states within this video: "If I had my time again I would have gone back and done the gig. I'd have done that gig and I'd have done the next gig and we'd have all gone away and we could have probably discussed it. We may never have split up."

On 26 February 2014, Noel via the band's official website announced that the first three studio albums would be reissued, remastered and re-released throughout the remainder of 2014 to commemorate the 20th anniversary of Definitely Maybe. A remastered 3-disc version of Definitely Maybe was released on 19 May 2014.

A documentary titled Oasis: Supersonic was released on 26 October 2016, which tells the story of Oasis from their beginnings to the height of their fame during the summer of 1996. Produced by the same team behind the Academy Award-winning biopic Amy, Oasis: Supersonic features up close and personal footage, as well as never before seen archive material and interviews with the band.

On 29 April 2020, Noel announced through the band's social media pages that a new demo recording, "Don't Stop...", had been found, and would be released at midnight the following day. The track, previously only known from a recording during a soundcheck in Hong Kong, was rediscovered during the COVID-19 pandemic, and would be the first track to be released by the band in over 10 years. The demo passed 1 million views on YouTube on the morning of 3 May 2020 and reached number 80 on the UK Singles Chart based on streaming alone.

In July 2021, in celebration of the 25th anniversary of Oasis's two record breaking concerts at Knebworth Park in August 1996, a new concert documentary film, combining new interviews, previously unreleased archival footage, and live concert footage from both nights, titled Oasis Knebworth 1996, was released in cinemas on 23 September 2021. The release of the film marks the first time that concert footage from the two gigs has ever been released. The documentary was released on home media on 19 November 2021, alongside a double live album of the same name, containing 20 songs from across both nights.

Influences

Musically, Oasis have been regarded as a rock, Britpop, and power pop band. Oasis were most heavily influenced by the Beatles, an influence that was frequently labelled as an "obsession" by British media. In addition, members of Oasis have cited Bee Gees, David Bowie, Buzzcocks, the Damned, the Doors, Bob Dylan, Peter Green–era Fleetwood Mac, Jimi Hendrix, the Jam, Joy Division, the Kinks, the La's, Led Zeppelin, MC5, New Order, Pink Floyd, the Rolling Stones, Sex Pistols, Slade, Small Faces, the Smiths, the Stooges, the Stone Roses, U2, T. Rex, the Velvet Underground, the Verve, the Who, and Neil Young, as an influence or inspiration.

Legal battles over songwriter credits
Legal action has been taken against Noel Gallagher and Oasis for plagiarism on three occasions. The first was the case of Neil Innes (formerly of the Bonzo Dog Doo-Dah Band and the Rutles) suing to prove the Oasis song "Whatever" borrowed from his song "How Sweet to Be an Idiot". Innes was eventually awarded royalties and a co-writer credit. Noel Gallagher claimed in 2010 that the plagiarism was unintentional and he was unaware of the similarities until informed of Innes's legal case. In the second incident, Oasis were sued by Coca-Cola and forced to pay $500,000 in damages to the New Seekers after it was alleged that the Oasis song  "Shakermaker" had lifted words and melody from "I'd Like to Teach the World to Sing". When asked about the incident, Noel Gallagher joked "Now we all drink Pepsi." On the third and final occasion, when promotional copies of (What's the Story) Morning Glory? were originally distributed, they contained a previously unreleased bonus song called "Step Out". This promotional CD was quickly withdrawn and replaced with a version that omitted the controversial song, which was allegedly similar to the Stevie Wonder song "Uptight (Everything's Alright)". Official releases of "Step Out", as the B-side to "Don't Look Back in Anger" and on Familiar to Millions, listed "Wonder, et al." as co-writers.

The 2003 song "Life Got Cold" by UK band Girls Aloud received attention due to similarities between the guitar riff and melody of the song and that of the Oasis song "Wonderwall". A BBC review stated "part of the chorus sounds like it is going to turn into 'Wonderwall' by Oasis." Warner/Chappell Music has since credited Noel Gallagher as co-songwriter.

Legacy and influence
Despite parting ways in 2009, Oasis remain hugely influential in British music and culture and are now recognised as one of the biggest and most acclaimed bands of the 1990s. They are widely recognized as one of the spearheads of Britpop, which has claimed a prominent place in the British musical landscape. With their record breaking sales, concerts, sibling disputes, and their high-profile chart battle with Britpop rivals Blur, Oasis were a major part of 1990s UK pop culture, an era dubbed Cool Britannia. Many bands and artists have cited Oasis as an influence or inspiration, including Arctic Monkeys, Catfish and the Bottlemen, Deafheaven, the Killers, Alvvays, Maroon 5, Coldplay, and Ryan Adams.

The band's success also helped local businesses. Pete Caban, owner of Bandwagon Music Supplies in Perth, Scotland, which closed in 2020 after 37 years in business, said: "The highlight years were the mid-90s to the early 2000s. That was the peak period. The Oasis period, as I call it, where everyone wanted to buy a guitar. That was the game changer for music and for me here in Perth. I was shovelling guitars out the door at the point. So hurrah for Noel Gallagher."

In 2007, Oasis were one of the four featured artists in the seventh episode of the BBC/VH1 series Seven Ages of Rock – an episode about British indie rock – along with Britpop peers Blur in addition to the Smiths and the Stone Roses.

Band members

Final members
 Liam Gallagher – vocals, tambourine 
 Noel Gallagher – lead guitar, vocals , rhythm guitar 
 Gem Archer – rhythm and lead guitar , backing vocals , keyboards , harmonica 
 Andy Bell – bass guitar , keyboards 

Former members
 Tony McCarroll – drums 
 Paul Arthurs – rhythm guitar , lead guitar , keyboards , bass guitar 
 Paul McGuigan – bass guitar 
 Alan White – drums, percussion 

Touring members
 Scott McLeod – bass guitar 
 Mike Rowe – keyboards 
 Matt Deighton – rhythm guitar 
 Steve White – drums 
 Zeb Jameson – keyboards 
 Zak Starkey – drums, percussion 
 Jay Darlington – keyboards 
 Chris Sharrock – drums, percussion

Timeline

Discography

 Definitely Maybe (1994)
 (What's the Story) Morning Glory? (1995)
 Be Here Now (1997)
 Standing on the Shoulder of Giants (2000)
 Heathen Chemistry (2002)
 Don't Believe the Truth (2005)
 Dig Out Your Soul (2008)

Concert tours
 Definitely Maybe Tour (1994–1995)
 (What's the Story) Morning Glory? Tour (1995–1996)
 Be Here Now Tour (1997–1998)
 Standing on the Shoulder of Giants Tour (1999–2000)
 The Tour of Brotherly Love (2001)
 Heathen Chemistry Tour (2002–2003)
 Don't Believe the Truth Tour (2005–2006)
 Dig Out Your Soul Tour (2008–2009)

Awards and nominations

References

Bibliography

Harris, John. Britpop!: Cool Britannia and the Spectacular Demise of English Rock. Da Capo Press, 2004.

External links

 

 
1991 establishments in England
2009 disestablishments in England
Brit Award winners
MTV Europe Music Award winners
Britpop groups
Creation Records artists
Columbia Records artists
Epic Records artists
English rock music groups
Ivor Novello Award winners
Musical groups established in 1991
Musical groups disestablished in 2009
Musical groups from Manchester
Musical quintets
NME Awards winners
Reprise Records artists
Sibling musical groups
Sony Music UK artists